Nate Dreiling (born October 27, 1990) is an American football coach and former linebacker. He played for the Omaha Mammoths of the Fall Experimental Football League (FXFL). He played college football for the Pittsburg State Gorillas of NCAA Division II. He helped the Gorillas to a national championship in 2011. He signed with the Green Bay Packers of the National Football League (NFL) as an undrafted free agent.  After being released he signed with the Kansas City Chiefs as a free agent.

References

External links
Pittsburg State Player Bio
Dreiling invite to Packers tryout
Packers Hopeful Nate Dreiling
Nate Dreiling invite to Chiefs camp
Dreiling signs with FXFL

1990 births
Living people
People from Victoria, Kansas
American football linebackers
Omaha Mammoths players
Pittsburg State Gorillas football players
Green Bay Packers players
Kansas City Chiefs players
Players of American football from Kansas